Charagua Airport is an airport serving Charagua in the Santa Cruz Department of Bolivia. The runway is adjacent to the east side of the town.

See also

Transport in Bolivia
List of airports in Bolivia

References

External links 
OpenStreetMap - Charagua
OurAirports - Charagua
Fallingrain - Charagua Airport

Airports in Santa Cruz Department (Bolivia)